The women's 200 metres freestyle at the 2018 World Para Swimming European Championships was held at the National Aquatic Centre in Dublin from 13 – 19 August.  2 classification finals are held in all over this event.

Medalists

See also
List of IPC world records in swimming

References

200 metres freestyle